Vērgale Parish is an administrative unit of South Kurzeme Municipality in the Courland region of Latvia. The parish has a population of 1473 (as of 1/07/2010) and covers an area of 190.635 km2.

Villages of Vērgale Parish 
 Bebe (Vecbebe)
 Ploce
 Saraikas muiža
 Saraiķi (Kopdarbs)
 Vērgale
 Vērgales stacija
 Ziemupe

See also 
 Vergale Palace

Parishes of Latvia
South Kurzeme Municipality
Courland